RNA polymerase I-specific transcription initiation factor RRN3 is an enzyme that in humans is encoded by the RRN3 gene.

Interactions 

RRN3 has been shown to interact with TAF1B.

References

Further reading